The First Lubbers cabinet was the executive branch of the Dutch Government from 4 November 1982 until 14 July 1986. The cabinet was formed by the christian-democratic Christian Democratic Appeal (CDA) and the conservative-liberal People's Party for Freedom and Democracy (VVD) after the election of 1982. The cabinet was a right-wing coalition and had a substantial majority in the House of Representatives with Christian Democratic Leader Ruud Lubbers serving as Prime Minister. Prominent Liberal politician Gijs van Aardenne, a former Minister of Economic Affairs, served as Deputy Prime Minister and returned Minister of Economic Affairs.

The cabinet served during the Economic expansion of the 1980s, domestically it was able to implement several major social reforms to Social security and stimulating privatization and sustainable development and dealing with early 1980s recession, internationally it had to deal with several crises such as the decision to allow NATO to place the Medium Extended Air Defense System (MEADS) at Woensdrecht Air Base. The cabinet suffered several major internal conflicts including a critical parliamentary inquiry into Deputy Prime Minister Van Aardenne, but completed its entire term and was succeeded by a continuation of the coalition in the Second Lubbers cabinet following the election of 1986.

Formation
Following the fall of the Second Van Agt cabinet on 12 May 1982 the Labour Party (PvdA) left the coalition, subsequently on 14 May 1982 Queen Beatrix appointed Senator Piet Steenkamp (CDA) as Informateur to look at the possibilities of the Labour Party rejoining the coalition. After negotiations between the parties, Piet Steenkamp failed to reach an agreement between the parties. On 25 May 1982 Queen Beatrix appointed incumbent Prime Minister Dries van Agt (CDA) as Formateur to form a rump cabinet with the Christian Democratic Appeal (CDA) and the Democrats 66 (D'66). On 29 May 1982 the Third Van Agt cabinet was installed and served as a caretaker government until the election of 1982.

After the election on 8 September 1982 the Labour Party of Joop den Uyl was the winner of the election winning 3 new seats and had now a total of 47 seats. The Christian Democratic Appeal of incumbent Prime Minister Dries van Agt lost 3 seats and now had 45 seats. The People's Party for Freedom and Democracy under the new leadership of Ed Nijpels was the biggest winner gaining 10 new seats and now had a total of 36 seats in the House of Representatives.

On 10 September 1982 Queen Beatrix appointed Member of the House of Representatives Jos van Kemenade (PvdA), the former Minister of Education and Sciences as Informateur to start the cabinet formation process. The first round of talks between the Labour Party and the Christian Democratic Appeal were troubled by the personal animosity between incumbent Prime Minister and Leader of the Christian Democratic Appeal Dries van Agt and former Prime Minister and Leader of the Labour Party Joop den Uyl. Van Agt had served as Deputy Prime Minister under Den Uyl his cabinet, and Den Uyl had served as Deputy Prime Minister under Van Agt in his Second cabinet. On 30 September 1982 after long negotiations between the parties, Jos van Kemenade failed to reach an agreement to form a new coalition.

On 1 October 1982 Queen Beatrix appointed Vice-President of the Council of State Willem Scholten (CDA), a former Minister of Defence as Informateur to start a cabinet formation process between the Christian Democratic Appeal and the People's Party for Freedom and Democracy. Soon there after incumbent Prime Minister and Leader of the Christian Democratic Appeal Dries van Agt unexpectedly announced his retirement from national politics and stood down as Leader of the Christian Democratic Appeal on 25 October 1982 and subsequently endorsed the Parliamentary leader of the Christian Democratic Appeal in the House of Representatives Ruud Lubbers, a former Minister of Economic Affairs as his successor. On 30 October 1982 the Christian Democratic Appeal and the People's Party for Freedom and Democracy agreed to form a coalition and Queen Beatrix subsequently appointed Ruud Lubbers as Formateur and tasked him with forming a new cabinet. On 4 November 1982 the cabinet formation was completed and the First Lubbers cabinet was installed with Ruud Lubbers as Prime Minister.

Term

Changes
On 12 November 1982 just 4 days after taking office State Secretary for Defence Charl Schwietert (VVD) resigned after he admitted to have falsified his curriculum vitae. On 12 November 1982 Mayor of Coevorden Willem Hoekzema (VVD) was appointed as his successor.

On 20 February 1986 Minister of the Interior Koos Rietkerk (VVD) unexpectedly died in his office from a heart Attack at the age of 58. Minister of Justice Frits Korthals Altes (VVD) served as acting Minister of the Interior until 12 March 1986 when Member of the House of Representatives Rudolf de Korte (VVD) was installed as the new Minister of the Interior.
 
On 22 June 1986 State Secretary for Economic Affairs Piet van Zeil (CDA) resigned after he was appointed as Mayor of Heerlen and because the cabinet was already demissionary he was not replaced.

Cabinet Members

Trivia
 Three cabinet members would later serve as European Commissioner: Hans van den Broek (1993–1999), Neelie Kroes (2004–2014) and Frits Bolkestein (1999–2004)

References

External links
Official

  Kabinet-Lubbers I Parlement & Politiek
  Kabinet-Lubbers I Rijksoverheid

Cabinets of the Netherlands
1982 establishments in the Netherlands
1986 disestablishments in the Netherlands
Cabinets established in 1982
Cabinets disestablished in 1986